The Gate to the East, also known as the Gate of the Orient, is the second tallest building in Suzhou, Jiangsu, China behind Suzhou IFS. It is intended to be a symbol of a gateway to the city which emphasizes the city's continuing significance in modern China. Construction began in 2004 and was completed in 2016 at a cost of $700 million USD. Its location precisely indicates the intersection of the historical east-west-axis of Suzhou Old Town with the west bank of Jinji Lake.

Criticism
Though its design was intended to evoke a gateway, the Gate to the East has been subjected to mockery by many Chinese netizens and western mass media as well, as "resembling a pair of trousers". The landmark has thus led to a slew of internet parodies.

Transport
Suzhou Rail Transit:   at Dongfangzhimen Station

See also

 Architecture of China
 List of tallest buildings in China
 Suzhou Zhongnan Center
 CCTV Headquarters

References

Buildings and structures completed in 2014
Landmarks in China
Skyscrapers in Suzhou
Suzhou Industrial Park
Towers in China
Skyscraper office buildings in China